Atlantis Ascendant is the fifth studio album by English metal band Bal-Sagoth. It was released in April 2001 through Nuclear Blast. This was the first Bal-Sagoth album to be recorded (albeit only partially) with digital recording technology.

The album's primary story and lyrical concept as written by vocalist-lyricist Byron Roberts centres on the exploits of a fictional nineteenth-century British archaeologist and adventurer named Professor Caleb Blackthorne III, who has dedicated his life to the field of antediluvian anthropology and to seeking out evidence as to the true nature of humanity's origin. As with many protagonists in the Lovecraftian fashion, his investigations lead to madness and death.

In November 2011, Atlantis Ascendant was reissued as a limited edition digipak by Nuclear Blast's affiliate label Metal Mind Productions. The reissue featured an expanded lyric booklet, additional artwork and remastered audio.

In July 2013, Atlantis Ascendant was released on CD in Argentina via Icarus Music under license from Nuclear Blast GmbH.

On 16 October 2020 Atlantis Ascendant was reissued as a digipak CD edition via Dissonance Productions.

In February 2021 a limited edition LP of Atlantis Ascendant featuring a lenticular 3D cover was released via the Italian specialist vinyl label Night of the Vinyl Dead.

In May 2022, Atlantis Ascendant was reissued as a single disc gatefold sleeve LP edition via the UK specialist vinyl label Back On Black.

Track listing 

These bonus tracks were taken from the 1993 demo.

Personnel 
 Byron Roberts – vocals, cover art concept, design
 Chris Maudling – guitars
 Jonny Maudling – keyboards
 Mark Greenwell – bass
 Dave Mackintosh – drums

Additional personnel
 Mags – engineering, mixing, producer
 Martin Hanford – cover art, artwork (illustrations)
 Simon Lee – photography

References 

Bal-Sagoth albums
2001 albums
Concept albums